Opinion Research Center of Afghanistan (ORCA) is a social science research organization based in Kabul, Afghanistan. It operates in the areas of opinion, market and media research. It was founded in 2008, and claims to be "the largest full-service Afghan research center operating in the areas of market, media and opinion research." ORCA is Afghan-owned, and its survey enumerators are locally recruited.

References

External links
 ORCA website

Research institutes in Afghanistan
2008 establishments in Afghanistan